Mbariman-Gudhinma (Rimanggudinhma, Rimang-Gudinhma, Parimankutinma), one of several languages labelled Gugu Warra (Kuku-Warra, Kuku-Wara) 'unintelligible speech' as opposed to Gugu Mini 'intelligible speech', is an extinct dialect cluster of Aboriginal Australian languages of the Cape York Peninsula in northern Queensland, Australia. Another one in the group is Wurangung, also known as Yadaneru or Jeteneru.

The dialects were spoken by the Lamalama people.

Austlang says, quoting linguist Jean-Cristophe Verstraete (2018), that Lamalama, Rimanggudinhma (Mbariman-Gudhinma) and Morrobolam form a genetic subgroup of Paman known as Lamalamic, "defined by shared innovations in phonology and morphology". Within this subgroup, "Morrobolam and Lamalama form a phonologically innovative branch, while Rumanggudinhma forms a more conservative branch".

References 

Paman languages
Extinct languages of Queensland
Languages extinct in the 2000s